New Theatre Quarterly (NTQ) is a peer-reviewed academic journal covering theatre studies. It is published by Cambridge University Press. New Theatre Quarterly succeeds Theatre Quarterly (1971–81). Over the years, NTQ has developed a reputation for a "down-to-earth approach" to theatre studies.

Its general editor is Maria Shevtsova of Goldsmiths, University of London. Former co-editors were Simon Trussler of Rose Bruford College (1942–2019) and Clive Barker (1931–2005). Trussler and Barker were the journals founding editors.

Abstracting and indexing
The journal is abstracted and indexed in:

 Academic Search Premier
 Arts & Humanities Citation Index
 Current Contents / Arts & Humanities
 Expanded Academic ASAP
 MLA International Bibliography

References

External links
 

Theatre studies
Cambridge University Press academic journals
Arts journals
Publications established in 1971
English-language journals